Stephen Harvey may refer to:

 Stephen Harvey (biologist) (born 1940), structural biologist
 Stephen Harvey (architect) (1879–1933), English-born architect in Queensland, Australia
 Stephen Harvey (author) (died 1993), author, film critic, and curator
 Stephen Harvey (cricketer) (born 1964), English cricketer
 A pseudonym used by A. D. Harvey

See also
 Steve Harvey (born 1957), American comedian and television host